Dystroglycan is a protein that in humans is encoded by the DAG1 gene.

Dystroglycan is one of the dystrophin-associated glycoproteins, which is encoded by a 5.5 kb transcript in Homo sapiens on chromosome 3. There are two exons that are separated by a large intron. The spliced exons code for a protein product that is finally cleaved into two non-covalently associated subunits, [alpha] (N-terminal) and [beta] (C-terminal).

Function 

In skeletal muscle the dystroglycan complex works as a transmembrane linkage between the extracellular matrix and the cytoskeleton. [alpha]-dystroglycan is extracellular and binds to merosin [alpha]-2 laminin in the basement membrane, while [beta]-dystroglycan is a transmembrane protein and binds to dystrophin, which is a large rod-like cytoskeletal protein, absent in Duchenne muscular dystrophy patients. Dystrophin binds to intracellular actin cables. In this way, the dystroglycan complex, which links the extracellular matrix to the intracellular actin cables, is thought to provide structural integrity in muscle tissues. The dystroglycan complex is also known to serve as an agrin receptor in muscle, where it may regulate agrin-induced acetylcholine receptor clustering at the neuromuscular junction. There is also evidence which suggests the function of dystroglycan as a part of the signal transduction pathway because it is shown that Grb2, a mediator of the Ras-related signal pathway, can interact with the cytoplasmic domain of dystroglycan.

Expression 

Dystroglycan is widely distributed in non-muscle tissues as well as in muscle tissues. During epithelial morphogenesis of kidney, the dystroglycan complex is shown to act as a receptor for the basement membrane. Dystroglycan expression in Mus musculus brain and neural retina has also been reported. However, the physiological role of dystroglycan in non-muscle tissues remains unclear.

Recently, the implications of abnormal dystroglycan expression and/or O-mannosylation on the pathogenesis of cancer have been reviewed.

Interactions 

Dystroglycan has been shown to interact with FYN, C-src tyrosine kinase, Src, NCK1, Grb2, Caveolin 3 and SHC1.

See also 
 Actin-binding protein
 Agrin

References

Further reading

External links 
 
 Overview at sdbonline.org

Glycoproteins
Single-pass transmembrane proteins